is a former Japanese football player.

Playing career
Yokozeki was born in Osaka Prefecture on September 11, 1979. After graduating from Kansai University, he joined J2 League club Ventforet Kofu in 2002. He debuted as substitute defender from the 89th minute against Shonan Bellmare on April 6.After the debut, he played 5 matches until May. However he could only play this 5 matches and left the club end of 2002 season.

Club statistics

References

External links

1979 births
Living people
Kansai University alumni
Association football people from Osaka Prefecture
Japanese footballers
J2 League players
Ventforet Kofu players
Association football defenders